The Disappearance of Azaria Chamberlain is a 1984 Australian television docufilm about the Azaria Chamberlain case.

Michael Thornhill later said that "I don't have strong opinions about it [the film]. There are quite a few cheats in it, but at least what it did do - I'm not emotionally close to it - was put the audience in the view of I, the Jury. It has an enormous following in northern Europe. I think Judy did a terrific job. I think it was interesting but, again, it's not a personal project."

Cast
 Elaine Hudson ... Lindy Chamberlain
 John Hamblin ... Michael Chamberlain
 Max Phipps ... Mr Baker QC
 Peter Caroll ... Mr Phillips QC
 Sandy Gutman ... Himself (as Austen Tayshus)

References

External links

The Disappearance of Azaria Chamberlain at Screen Australia

1984 television films
1984 films
Australian drama television films
Works by Frank Moorhouse
Films set in the Northern Territory
Films scored by Chris Neal (songwriter)
1984 drama films
1980s English-language films
Films directed by Michael Thornhill